Caecum imbricatum is a species of minute sea snail, a marine gastropod mollusk or micromollusk in the family Caecidae.

Distribution

Description
The maximum recorded shell length is 4.5 mm.

Habitat
Minimum recorded depth is 0 m. Maximum recorded depth is 183 m.

References

External links

Caecidae
Gastropods described in 1858